Cal Pal  is a house located at La Cortinada, Ordino Parish, Andorra. It is a heritage property registered in the Cultural Heritage of Andorra. It was built in 1347.

References

Ordino
Houses in Andorra
Cultural Heritage of Andorra